Dr. phil. Fritz Walter (March 15, 1900 – January 5, 1981) was one of the most successful and important chairmen of the VfB Stuttgart.

1900 births
1981 deaths
German football chairmen and investors
VfB Stuttgart people
People from the Kingdom of Württemberg